Streptoglossa liatroides is a species of flowering plant in the family Asteraceae. It is a low, spreading or upright perennial herb with pink or red to purple flowers. It grows in South Australia, New South Wales, Western Australia and the Northern Territory.

Description
The leaves and branches are faintly fragrant, and covered with soft, weak, separated thin hairs and glandular.

Taxonomy and naming
Streptoglossa liatroides was first described by Nicolai Stepanovitch Turczaninow as Erigeron liatroides. In 1981 Clyde Robert Dunlop changed the name to Streptoglossa liatroides and the description was published in  Journal of the Adelaide Botanic Garden. The specific epithet (liatroides) means like the genus Liatris.

Distribution and habitat
Wertaloona daisy grows in a variety of soils including coastal limestone, and sometimes on stony flats near sand dunes.

References

Asterales of Australia
Flora of the Northern Territory
Flora of Western Australia
Flora of New South Wales
Flora of South Australia
liatroides